Vanak (also Romanized as Wanak) is a city in the Central District of Semirom County, Isfahan Province, Iran. At the 2006 census, its population was 2,509, in 653 families.

References

Populated places in Semirom County

Cities in Isfahan Province